The Bordered Red Banner was one of the Eight Banners of the Manchu military and society among the lower five banners during the Later Jin and Qing dynasty of China.

Members

 Cuigiya Lianyuan
 Consort Jin
 Noble Consort Ying (Mongol)
 Zhou Youde (Han)

Notable clans 

 Barin
 Cuigiya
 Tatara
 Wanyan
 Namdulu
 Zhou

References